Mary Odile Cahoon OSB (1929-2011) was an American Benedictine nun who was among the first women to do research in Antarctica.

In 1974, Mary Odile Cahoon and Mary Alice McWhinnie became the first women scientists to overwinter at McMurdo Station, Antarctica, with 128 men, although the first woman to be there in the winter was in 1947 and other countries had taken women to Antarctica for some years.

Education, early life, and career 
Mary Odile Cahoon grew up in upper Michigan, and attended college at the College of St. Scholastica. She received her MS degree from DePaul University, where she worked with McWhinnie. Cahoon held a doctoral degree in Biology from the University of Toronto. She returned to the College of St. Scholastica to teach, and during the summers, Cahoon continued to do biological work at DePaul University, and at Argonne National Lab. She was invited by McWhinnie to be part of a five-person research team, studying adaptation to cold temperatures in invertebrates and fish. After this trip, Cahoon was asked to speak about her experiences at public events, though she never returned to Antarctica.

At The College of St. Scholastica, Cahoon served as department chair, academic dean, and senior vice president, and trustee. She also started the College's study abroad program in Ireland. In addition to her college work, Cahoon was the treasurer for the monastic Benedictine community for over 10 years.

References 

College of St. Scholastica
Benedictine nuns
American women biologists
1929 births
2011 deaths
Women Antarctic scientists
20th-century American Roman Catholic nuns
21st-century American Roman Catholic nuns
American Antarctic scientists